Stranger Things: The First Shadow is a stage play based on the Netflix Original Series Stranger Things. The play acts a prequel to the events of the series. It is being produced by Sonia Friedman's production company in conjunction with Netflix and will premiere in late 2023 at the Phoenix Theatre at the West End in London.

Premise
Set in 1959, the play will focus on young Jim Hopper and Joyce Maldonado dealing with 'the shadows of the past'.

Production
In July 2022, it was revealed that a spin-off stage play and a spinoff series was in the works. The stage play will be produced by Sonia Friedman and Stephen Daldry. On March 1, 2023, it was announced as Stranger Things: The First Shadow

References

External links

2023 plays
British plays
Stranger Things (TV series)
West End plays
Collaborative plays
Plays set in the 20th century